Khavar Shahr (also Romanized as Khāvar Shahr; also known as Shahrak-e Khāvar Shahr) is a village in Ghaniabad Rural District of the Central District of Ray County, Tehran province, Iran. At the 2006 National Census, its population was 16,171 in 4,342 households. The following census in 2011 counted 15,148 people in 4,484 households. The latest census in 2016 showed a population of 13,203 people in 4,002 households; it was the largest village in its rural district.

References 

Ray County, Iran

Populated places in Tehran Province

Populated places in Ray County, Iran